Jim Davies may refer to:

Sports
Jim Davies (footballer) (1926–2010), Australian rules footballer
Jim Davies (rugby), Welsh rugby union, and rugby league footballer of the 1900s, 1910s and 1920s, and rugby league coach of the 1920s
Jimmy Davies (1929–1966), American racecar driver in Champ cars, and midgets

Other
Jim Davies (computer scientist), Professor of Software Engineering, University of Oxford
Jim Davies (cognitive scientist), professor at Carleton University
Jim Davies (musician) (born 1973), guitarist for bands The Prodigy and Pitchshifter
Jimmy Davies (RAF officer) (1913–1940), first American-born airman to die in World War II combat

See also 
 Jimmy Davies (disambiguation)
 James Davies (disambiguation)
 James Davis (disambiguation)